Rudasingwa is a Rwandan surname. Notable people with the surname include:

 Longin Rudasingwa, a Rwandan professional football manager.
 Theogene Rudasingwa, a leading figure in the Rwanda National Congress.
 Jean-Marie Rudasingwa, a Rwandan Olympic middle-distance runner.

Rwandan culture